Minuscule 554 (in the Gregory-Aland numbering), ε 332 (in the Soden numbering), is a Greek minuscule manuscript of the New Testament, on parchment. It is dated by a Colophon to the year 1271 or 1272. 
Scrivener labelled it by number 541.

Description 

The codex contains a complete text of the four Gospels on 230 parchment leaves (size ). The writing is in one column per page, 20-22 lines per page.

The text of Luke 1:34-56 was supplied by a later hand.

Text 

The Greek text of the codex is a representative of the Byzantine text-type. Hermann von Soden classified it to the textual family Kx. Aland placed it in Category V.
According to the Claremont Profile Method it represents the textual family Kx in Luke 10 and Luke 20. In Luke 1 it has mixed Byzantine text.

The Pericope Adulterae (John 7:53-8:11) is omitted.

History 

The manuscript was held in the monastery Mar Saba. In 1834 Robert Curzon, Lord Zouche, brought this manuscript to England (along with the codices 548, 552, 554). The entire collection of Curzon was bequeathed by his daughter in 1917 to the British Museum, where it had been deposited, by his son, since 1876.

The manuscripts was added to the list of the New Testament minuscule manuscripts by F. H. A. Scrivener (541) and C. R. Gregory (553).

The manuscript was examined by Scrivener, Dean Burgon, and Gregory.

It is currently housed at the British Library (Add MS 39597) in London.

See also 

 List of New Testament minuscules
 Biblical manuscript
 Textual criticism

References

Further reading 
 S. Emmel, Catalogue of Materials for Writing, Early Writings on Tablets and Stones, rolled and other Manuscripts and Oriental Manuscript Books, in the Library of the Honourable Robert Curzon (London 1849).
 A. Turyn, Dated Greek Manuscripts of the Thirteenth and Fourteenth Centuries in the Libraries of Great Britain, Dumbarton Oaks Series XVII (Washington, D.C., 1980); plates pp. 8, 9, 10; description pp. 21–22.

External links 

Greek New Testament minuscules
13th-century biblical manuscripts
British Library additional manuscripts